Monica Seles defeated Jana Novotná in the final, 5–7, 6–3, 6–1 to win the women's singles tennis title at the 1991 Australian Open.  She became the first woman in the Open Era to win the Australian Open after saving a match point, doing so in the semifinals against Mary Joe Fernández.

Steffi Graf was the three-time defending champion, but lost to Novotná in the quarterfinals.

Seeds
The seeded players are listed below. Monica Seles is the champion; others show the round in which they were eliminated.

  Steffi Graf (quarterfinals)
  Monica Seles (champion)
  Mary Joe Fernández (semifinals)
  Gabriela Sabatini (quarterfinals)
  Katerina Maleeva (quarterfinals)
  Arantxa Sánchez Vicario (semifinals)
  Manuela Maleeva (second round)
  Zina Garrison (fourth round)
  Helena Suková (third round)
  Jana Novotná (finalist)
  Natasha Zvereva (fourth round)
  Barbara Paulus (second round)
  Amy Frazier (fourth round)
  Rosalyn Fairbank-Nideffer (third round)
  Laura Gildemeister (second round)
  Sabine Appelmans (fourth round)

Qualifying

Draw

Key
 Q = Qualifier
 WC = Wild card
 LL = Lucky loser
 r = Retired

Finals

Earlier rounds

Section 1

Section 2

Section 3

Section 4

Section 5

Section 6

Section 7

Section 8

External links
 1991 Australian Open – Women's draws and results at the International Tennis Federation

Women's singles
Australian Open (tennis) by year – Women's singles
1991 in Australian women's sport